Deb Richardson (born February 17, 1961) is an American beach volleyball player. After finishing second in the American trials with her partner Gail Castro; they competed in the women's tournament at the 1996 Summer Olympics. In 1997 she started her ninth season in the WPVA tour, playing with Linda Chisholm.

She played collegiately at the University of Alaska-Anchorage.

References

External links
 

1961 births
Living people
American women's beach volleyball players
Olympic beach volleyball players of the United States
Beach volleyball players at the 1996 Summer Olympics
Sportspeople from Minneapolis
20th-century American women